A Lemprex ejector is a type of Steam locomotive exhaust system developed by noted Argentinian locomotive engineer Livio Dante Porta (d. 2003). The name is a stylization of LeMaitre Porta Exhaust.

In a steam locomotive, draft is produced in the firebox by exhausting the steam coming from the cylinders out the chimney. The Lemprex exhaust will deliver improved draughting capacity over traditional exhaust systems. 

However development is only at an early stage. Some work was undertaken in Brazil during the late 1980s and early 90s. During more recent years locomotive engineer Shaun T. Mc Mahon has continued the development of this exhaust system in Argentina and other countries around the World, current development work being focussed upon ex FCGR 12E No.3925 and ex FCGR 8A No.3351.

External links
LemPor Exhaust on The Ultimate Steam Page.

Steam locomotive technologies
Steam locomotive exhaust systems
Locomotive parts